Dongjiaotou station is a metro station on Line 2 of the Shenzhen Metro. It opened on 28 December 2010.

It caters mainly to residents living in existing buildings along Wangxia Road, Shekou Square and the newer developments of "Peninsula I" and "Peninsula II", along the central part of Wanghai Road. Peninsula I and I are a set of residential skyscrapers developed by Shenzhen Nanhai Yitian Property Development, a subsidiary of the China Merchants Group.

Station layout

Exits

References

External links
 Shenzhen Metro Dongjiaotou Station (Chinese)
 Shenzhen Metro Dongjiaotou Station (English)

Shenzhen Metro stations
Railway stations in Guangdong
Nanshan District, Shenzhen
Railway stations in China opened in 2010